A Grumman Sportboat, (also Sport Boat, SportCanoe, or Sportee) is a 15' 4" long, 43" wide square stern canoe manufactured in the United States. Along with the Coleman Scanoe, Grumman sportboats are patterned after "Grand Lakers", wooden fishing guide boats built on Grand Lake, Maine for oar power, subsequently modified for the advent of small outboard engines with the addition of more bearing aft and a flat tumblehome transom.

The Sport Boat is designed to be rowed, sailed, or powered by an outboard motor, and is among few designs to be fairly efficient at all three. It can also be poled or paddled, but is too wide for efficient paddling. It is manufactured in a fashion similar to an aircraft, made of a stressed skin aluminum, riveted together, and weighs slightly over 110 pounds. In current production, it is rated for 805 pounds capacity and a  outboard motor. It can plane with as little as a 3.5 hp motor, and has been used with as much as a 25 hp motor. Moving a lone operator forward to the middle seat enables planing performance over 10 mph with as little as 2.5 hp. Ballasting the bow greatly improves operation under power.

As a canoe, the Grumman Sport Boat was originally rated for an 1,100 pound payload. Due to its unusual planing ability, the United States Coast Guard in the 1970s applied a different rating rule. Without any changes to the boat, the payload rating dropped to 550 pounds.  Evolving rules for planing boats, requiring level flotation when swamped with maximum payload and rated engine, led to the demise of production by Grumman in 1979. The inaugural issue of Small Boat Journal decried the end of Grumman's Sport Boat production in a black-bordered article evocative of a eulogy.  The Grumman Sport Boat was named by the editors of Small Boat Journal as one of the 10 best small boats of all time.

Boatbuilder and designer Robb White wrote of one in his essay "The Chicken Feed Boat," and made a strip-planked wood variant and sold the plans.  Small Boat Journal founding editor David Getchell wrote a feature SBJ article about the SportBoat and bought one, and mentioned it again in "Outboard Boater's Handbook: Advanced Seamanship and Practical Skills."

Early models included the mast base clip and gunwale holes to use with the Grumman factory sail kit, with either a gunter or lateen rig. Sail kits are long out of production.

1986 also saw the Grumman Boats’ purchase of an assembly plant in Minong, WI. All units produced at this location were assembled with parts supplied in the flat, shipped from either Marathon, NY or Arkadelphia, AR. This was done to achieve lower freight costs to dealers and consequently better sales penetration in the North Central and Northwestern market areas of the country. This strategy had been employed to a lesser degree some years earlier with limited success at Grumman sister locations in Carmichaels, PA and Corcoran, CA.

SportBoats remain popular in the Great Lakes and Midwestern United States, and are a favorite of duck hunters, frequently camouflaged with the oarlock sockets removed to eliminate hang-ups in grass.  Except on Alaskan rivers, Sport Boats are uncommon west of the Rockies. The University of Washington Aquatic Recreation Center has a dozen or so heavily used and extensively repaired SportBoats in its rowing fleet on Lake Washington at the Montlake Cut.

References
 "Outboard Boater's Handbook: Advanced Seamanship and Practical Skills" David Getchell, editor. 1994, International Marine, McGraw-Hill

External links
 Marathon Grumman Boat Information

Canoes